Mary Broadaway is an American politician who served as a member of the Arkansas House of Representatives for the 57th district from 2013 to 2017. Broadaway is also an attorney in private practice.

References

External links
 
Legislative page

Living people
Democratic Party members of the Arkansas House of Representatives
Women state legislators in Arkansas
Trinity University (Texas) alumni
University of Arkansas alumni
People from Paragould, Arkansas
21st-century American politicians
21st-century American women politicians
Year of birth missing (living people)